Route 260, or Highway 260, may refer to:

Australia
 Loddon Valley Highway

Canada
 Manitoba Provincial Road 260
 New Brunswick Route 260
 Prince Edward Island Route 260

Japan
 Japan National Route 260

Turkey
 State road D.260 (Turkey)

United States
 U.S. Route 260 (former)
 Arizona State Route 260
 California State Route 260
 Georgia State Route 260
 K-260 (Kansas Highway)
 Kentucky Route 260
 Maryland Route 260
 New York State Route 260
 Ohio State Route 260
 Oregon Route 260
 Pennsylvania Route 260 (former)
 South Carolina Highway 260
 Tennessee State Route 260
 Texas State Highway 260 (former)
 Texas State Highway Loop 260 (former)
 Texas State Highway Spur 260
 Utah State Route 260
 Washington State Route 260